Cone Islet is a small granite island, with an area of 4.82 ha, in south-eastern Australia.  It is part of Tasmania’s Curtis Group, lying in northern Bass Strait between the Furneaux Group and Wilsons Promontory in Victoria.

Fauna
Recorded breeding seabird and wader species include short-tailed shearwater, fairy prion, common diving-petrel, Pacific gull and sooty oystercatcher.  The metallic skink is also present.

See also
The other islands in the Curtis Group:
Curtis Island
Devils Tower
Sugarloaf Rock

References

Islands of Tasmania